Shatigadud International Airport Baidoa Somalia  is an airport serving Baidoa, the capital city of the Bay region in Somalia.

The airport was built in the 1960s, and at the time was 8,800 feet long and 150 feet wide, before being resurfaced with asphalt and lengthened to 9,600 feet in 1974 with Soviet support. 

By June 1975 it was home to a squadron of at least 6 Somali Air Force Mig-21's, and 2 Il-28 bombers.

Facilities
The airport houses a large military compound built in 2014.

Airlines and destinations

References

External links

 Aeronautical chart at SkyVector
 

Airports in Somalia
Bay, Somalia